This article is a list of people from the island of São Vicente, Cape Verde.  This is a list of people native to the island.  The list is ordered by area.

Mindelo

Hernani Almeida, musician
Bana, singer
Bau, singer
João Branco, theatrical actor, resident since 1991
Hermínia da Cruz Fortes, singer
Francisco Xavier da Cruz, better known as B. Leza, singer
Henrique ben David, 20th-century footballer
Delmiro, footballer
Humberto Duarte Fonseca, scientist
Vera Duarte, politician
Edivândio (Sequeira Reis), footballer
Djô d'Eloy, singer
Emerson da Luz, footballer
Cesária Évora, singer
Fantcha, singer
Manuel Ferreira, writer lived in the 1940s and the 1950s
Sérgio Ferreira, writer
Manuel Figueira, artist
Tchalé Figueira, artist
Aguinaldo Fonseca, writer
Corsino Fortes, writer, politician
Paula Fortes, independence activist
Eddy Fort Moda Grog, rapper
Sergio Frusoni, writer, poet
António Aurélio Gonçalves, writer
Carlos Filipe Gonçalves, writer
Vagner Gonçalves, footballer
Thierry Graça, footballer
Jorge Kadú, footballer
Belinda Lima, singer
Daniel Batista Lima, footballer currently resides in Greece
Leão Lopes – Community Developer, Documentary-Maker, Politician
Manuel Lopes, writer
João Cleófas Martins, writer
Ovídio Martins, poet
Georgina Mello, CPLP director-general
Thomas Miller, English cricketer
Eddy Moreno, singer
Oswaldo (or Osvaldo) Osório Alcantarâ, writer
Tito Paris singer
Péricles Pereira, footballer (soccer player)
Carlos Ponck, footballer
Luísa Queirós, artist
Elisângelo Ramos, producer and radio broadcaster
Gualberto do Rosário, politician
Steevan dos Santos, footballer/soccer player
Ailton Silva, footballer
José Lopes da Silva, poet
Onésimo Silveira, politician and writer
Jenifer Solidade, singer
Manuel Inocêncio Sousa, politician
Sténio (dos Santos), footballer
Dona Tututa singer
Vagner, footballer
João Vário, writer
Carlos Veiga, politician, former Prime Minister
Samir Vera-Cruz, actress
Vozinha (Josimar Dias), footballer
Roberto Xalino singer
Val Xalino, singer

Calhau
Vasco Martins, composer

Locality not listed

Boss AC, singer, rapper
Alexandre Alhinho, footballer and football manager
Carlos Alhinho footballer
Joel Almeida, basketball player
José Andrade, footballer
Leonel Almeida, singer
Jorge Borges, former foreign minister
Valter Borges, footballer
Dulce Almada Duarte, politician
Vasco da Gama Fernandes, lawyer and politician
Isaura Gomes, politician, pharmacist and former mayor
Carlos Silveira da Graça, footballer
Josimar Lima, footballer
Mailó, footballer
Mateus Lopes, footballer
Ryan Mendes, footballer
Luís de Montalvor, writer
Yolanda Morazzo writer
Oceano da Cruz, footballer and manager
Kévin Oliveira, footballer
António Paris, footballer, later emigrated to Portugal and played with its clubs
Erin Pinheiro, footballer
Rambé (do Rosario), footballer
Vanny Reis
Fredson Rodrigues, footballer
Titina (Albertina) Rodrigues, singer
Rolando footballer
Jovino dos Santos, singer
Paulos dos Santos, soccer player
Kenny Rocha Santos, footballer
Ericson Silva, footballer
Edson Silva, footballer and manager
Adriano Spencer, footballer
Fredson Tavares (Bock), footballer
Fátima Veiga, politician and former foreign minister
Lela Violão (Manuel Tomás da Cruz), a singer and a composer

References